Deuces are Wild was a concert residency by American hard rock band Aerosmith that originally lasted from April 2019 until February 2020, with 50 concerts at the Park Theater in Las Vegas, nine concerts at three MGM venues on the East Coast (three shows at the MGM National Harbor in Maryland, two shows at the Borgata in Atlantic City, New Jersey, and four shows at the MassMutual Center in Massachusetts), as well as festival performances in Minnesota and Ontario. This marked Aerosmith's first concert residency. The residency originally consisted of 18 Las Vegas concerts scheduled from April through July, but 17 additional Vegas concerts and the nine East Coast concerts were added due to high demand. An additional 15 shows in 2020 were added due to continued demand. The band announced a six-week European tour would take place during the summer of 2020 following the last of the residency dates. Due to the COVID-19 pandemic, the band announced on April 14, 2020 that the May and June performances would be postponed. On March 23, 2022, the band announced new 2022 dates going until December of that year. These were later cancelled as the result of lead singer Steven Tyler checking into rehab.

Aerosmith announced the residency at an appearance on NBC's Today show on August 15, 2018. The name of the residency, "Deuces are Wild", is a reference to both Las Vegas casino gambling and their 1994 single of the same name.

The show is rendered in Dolby Atmos.

Shows

Source:

Personnel
Steven Tyler–lead vocals
Joe Perry–lead guitar, lead and backing vocals
Tom Hamilton–bass guitar, backing vocals
Joey Kramer–drums
Brad Whitford–rhythm guitar, backing vocals
Buck Johnson–keyboards, backing vocals

References

External links
 

2019 concert residencies
Concert residencies in the Las Vegas Valley
Music events cancelled due to the COVID-19 pandemic
Aerosmith concert tours
Park MGM